Estadio Ciudad de los Deportes (English: “Sports City Stadium”; formerly Estadio Azul) is a 33,000-seat stadium located in Ciudad de los Deportes, Mexico City. This sports facility is used for association football matches and for American football as well. The Tazón México has been played at the stadium. It was the home of Mexican football club Cruz Azul until 2018, hence the previous nickname of Estadio Azul, and the Mexico national football team, especially in the early 1990s. In summer 2016, it was announced by Mexico City authorities that plans to demolish the stadium would begin at the end of the 2017-2018 Liga MX season. However, in July 2018, the demolition project was put on hold.

It is presently the home of Atlante F.C. The stadium was dubbed again with the nickname Estadio Azulgrana which it previously held during the 1980s and 1990s due to the fact that it was the home of Atlante F.C., whose club colors are blue and garnet.

Both times Mexico hosted the World Cup, Estadio Azul did not host matches mainly due to the age of the structure, bad parking facilities, and complex traffic patterns. A peculiarity of this stadium is that it is built as a pit with the playing field is below street level. Just beside the stadium is the Plaza México, the world's largest bullring.

Infrastructure
Following the arrival of Cruz Azul, there have been many renovations to make the stadium safer, more comfortable, and appropriate to the needs of fans. Among these amenities are:
Two professional football locker rooms
Two locker rooms for referees
A press conference room with seating capacity for 50 people
A closed-circuit video system including seventy cameras
Estadio Azul holds 33,000 people, including 92 boxes.

References

See also
List of football stadiums in Mexico

Azul
Benito Juárez, Mexico City
Cruz Azul
Azul
American football venues in Mexico
1946 establishments in Mexico
Sports venues completed in 1946